The submental triangle (or suprahyoid triangle) is a division of the anterior triangle of the neck.

Boundaries
It is limited to:
 Lateral (away from the midline), formed by the anterior belly of the digastricus 
 Medial (towards the midline), formed by the midline of the neck between the mandible and the hyoid bone
 Inferior (below), formed by the body of the hyoid bone 
Floor is formed by the mylohyoideus 
Roof is formed by Investing layer of deep cervical fascia

Contents
It contains one or two lymph glands, the submental lymph nodes (three or four in number) and Submental veins and commencement of anterior jugular veins.

(The contents of the triangle actually lie in the superficial fascia over the roof of submental triangle)

Additional images

See also
 Anterior triangle of the neck
 Submental space

References
, Page 88 of Textbook of Anatomy; head, neck and brain by Vishram Singh

External links
 
 
  - "Identification of the subdivsions of the anterior triangle and corresponding borders."
  - "Anterior Triangle of the Neck: The Submental Triangle"

Human head and neck
Triangles of the neck